Parker Hannifin Hall, formerly the George Howe residence/ George Howe mansion and also used as the Vixseboxse gallery, is a historic residence at 2258 Euclid Avenue in Cleveland, Ohio. It was acquired by Cleveland State University in 1982 and is used for offices. It is one of the few remaining homes from Millionaire's Row on Euclid Avenue.

References

Houses in Cleveland
Cleveland State University
Houses completed in 1894